Michael Todd Whitaker Carey (born March 13, 1971) is an American politician and former coal lobbyist serving as the U.S. representative for Ohio's 15th congressional district. A member of the Republican Party, Carey was first elected in a 2021 special election.

Early life and education 
Carey was raised in Sabina, Ohio. After attending East Clinton High School, he earned an Associate of Arts degree in economics from the Marion Military Institute and a Bachelor of Arts in history from Ohio State University.

Career 

Carey served in the Army National Guard from 1989 to 1999. As a college student, he worked as an aide to State Senator Merle G. Kearns. He has since worked as vice president of government affairs for American Consolidated Natural Resources, a coal company. He is also chairman of the board of the Ohio Coal Association. During the 2004 and 2008 presidential elections, Carey developed negative campaign ads against Democratic nominees John Kerry and Barack Obama.

U.S. House of Representatives

Elections

2021 special 

Carey was the Republican nominee in the 2021 15th congressional district special election. He was endorsed by former President Donald Trump and former Vice President Mike Pence.

Carey received the most financial contributions out of all 11 candidates in the Republican primary, including from out-of-state donors and individuals in the coal and mining industries. Political commentators and journalists called the race a test of Trump's influence over Republican politics. Carey won the special election on November 2.

117th Congress
On July 19, 2022, Carey and 46 other Republican representatives voted for the Respect for Marriage Act, which would codify the right to same-sex marriage in federal law. On July 28, 2022, Carey and 24 other Republican representatives voted for the CHIPS Act, increasing governmental funding for domestic semiconductor production. 

In late 2022, Carey announced his "complete" endorsement of Trump.

2022 midterm elections 
In the 2022 midterm elections, Carey defeated the Democratic nominee, union leader Gary Josephson. Carey raised around $2.3 million for this election, the 251st-highest sum among elected representatives.

118th Congress
Before the 118th Congress, Carey declared his support for Kevin McCarthy's bid for House Speaker amid controversy about McCarthy's leadership following the 2022 midterm elections. Carey also announced his intention to "get on the Ways and Means Committee" in the 118th Congress.

Committee assignments
Committee on the Budget
Committee on Science, Space, and Technology

Electoral history

2021 special election

2022 midterm election

References

External links 
 Congressman Mike Carey official U.S. House website
 Campaign website

 
 

|-

1971 births
American lobbyists
Living people
Marion Military Institute alumni
Ohio State University alumni
People from Sabina, Ohio
Republican Party members of the United States House of Representatives from Ohio